Philippe Massoni (13 January 1936 – 14 February 2015) was a French prefect.  He was the French co-prince's representative to Andorra from July 2002 to June 2007, replacing Frédéric de Saint-Sernin.

He had previously been chief of police for Paris.

References

1936 births
2015 deaths
French politicians
Diplomats from Marseille
Prefects of police of Paris
French people of Italian descent
Commandeurs of the Légion d'honneur